Edmund Newell (July 27, 1857 – December 23, 1915), better known as General Grant Jr. or Major Edward Newell, was a 19th-century dwarf who gained fame as an associate of P. T. Barnum. He was born in Chicago, Illinois, to Edmund S. Newell and Sarah Ellen Jimmerson.

Edmund married Minnie Warren in July, 1877 in Lock Haven, Pennsylvania. Minnie was also a dwarf, and so was her sister, Lavinia Warren, wife of General Tom Thumb. Minnie died in childbirth in 1878, and was buried in Nemasket Hill Cemetery, Middleborough, Massachusetts. After her death, Edmund moved to England and married Mary Ann Drake, a woman of normal stature, on April 5, 1888 in St. Giles, London, England. They had two children: Edmund Charles Jeffreys Newell and Daisy Louise Newell.

Edmund died on December 23, 1915, in Marylebone, London, England.

Bibliography 
Notes

References 

 - Total pages: 358 

 Alt URL

1857 births
1915 deaths
American entertainers
Entertainers with dwarfism
Sideshow performers
Ringling Bros. and Barnum & Bailey Circus
People from Middleborough, Massachusetts